Awake is a 2021 American science fiction thriller film, directed by Mark Raso, from a screenplay he wrote alongside Joseph Raso. It stars Gina Rodriguez, Jennifer Jason Leigh, Barry Pepper, Finn Jones, Shamier Anderson, Ariana Greenblatt, Frances Fisher, Elias Edraki, Lucius Hoyos and Gil Bellows.

The film was released by Netflix on June 9, 2021. It reached number one worldwide on the platform when it was released.

Plot

Former U.S. Army medic and recovering addict, Jill Adams, works as a security guard at a local college where she steals drugs from the research lab to sell. After her shift, she picks up her children, Noah and Matilda, from their grandmother, whose name is Doris.

While driving, their car loses power and is hit by another car, sending it into a lake. Matilda drowns but is revived by a police officer who reveals that everything that uses electricity is malfunctioning. At the hospital, they learn that the coma patients have awoken. They return home, but Jill, Noah, and Doris are unable to sleep, and Noah says he sees shooting stars which Jill explains are satellites. On her way to work, Jill observes that the whole neighborhood is awake. There,  psychiatrist Dr. Murphy explains that people appear to be no longer able to fall asleep. Thus, they will soon suffer from the symptoms of sleep deprivation. The only known exception is an old woman, who is being studied at a military base called The Hub, in the hopes of finding a cure for the condition. Jill remembers that Matilda can also fall asleep and she rushes home to find her, fearing that she will be taken to be studied/experimented on to find the cure as well, only to discover that she's at church. The pastor gives a sermon about Matilda being a beacon of hope and people want to sacrifice her. Jill and Noah arrive to get her but the churchgoers (aside from Doris and the pastor) does not want to give up Matilda. After an officer shoots and kills the doctor with Jill, the people panic and Doris is able to hide Matilda away. Jill, Matilda, and Noah flee to the woods. They rush to a garage to find a car. Jill leaves the two outside while she enters the garage. Jill takes a car after hiding from two men and picks up Noah and Matilda. Noah tells Jill that they should bring Matilda to The Hub and Jill eventually reluctantly agrees.

They reach a library and Noah finds a map. Noah and Jill use the map to find out how to get to The Hub. While doing so, an escaped prisoner steals their car with Matilda in it. Other prisoners threaten Jill and Noah but they are saved by the man who stole their car, Dodge. They discover plane wreckage and Noah and Dodge look for items they might need. Jill teaches Matilda to drive because she's the only one who has the energy to and to prepare her for the possibility of living alone when everyone else has died from sleep deprivation. While driving, they are attacked by people but manage to escape.

They reach The Hub. Dodge offers to stay but Jill gives him the car and tells him to leave. Jill splits up with her children and enters The Hub. She sneaks in disguised as a lab worker to find the other woman who can sleep. She finds her in very ill condition. The woman states she should have been dead months ago. Jill is convinced there is no cure so she begs the woman to raise Matilda. Jill is seen by Murphy and lies about wanting to be there to help. Jill asks if there is a cure and Murphy replies that it has been five days and there is no cure and that the lab workers have been using a drug that helps the brain function to keep them going but it is only temporary and causes neurological damage. The army confronts Jill and her children and Matilda tearfully admits she can sleep.

The next day, Matilda asks if she can help and the doctor responds that they need to find out what makes her special. She sees an ape who has been experimented on and sees that the ape doesn't fall asleep when given anesthetic gas. The doctor says that chimps were the only animals besides humans that can't sleep due to their biological closeness to us. They test the gas on Matilda and she falls asleep. Jill is handcuffed in a room where she experiences delirium.

Murphy asks Jill why her daughter can sleep and Jill begs Murphy to let Matilda go but she insists that humanity's survival depends on her. She explains that the sleep disorder was caused by the same solar flare that knocked out power affecting humans' (and chimps') brains. Dodge is taken as a guard and is given stimulants. The woman who can sleep goes into cardiac arrest and dies. Jill hallucinates that Noah is threatening to kill her. The real Noah is taken away to see if his brain is different than his sister's.

The soldiers then go insane and begin shooting everyone. Jill goes to rescue her daughter and the two run off together. Noah is hallucinating and cuts a wire, electrocuting himself. Jill and Matilda try resuscitating him using a defibrillator but are unsuccessful. Noah suddenly wakes up the next morning, saying that he was dreaming. Noah tells Jill that she was right about not wanting to go to The Hub and that he knows she loves them and needs them. Matilda realizes the reason that she and Noah could sleep was because they had both temporarily died. They drown Jill in a lake. They resuscitate her and she awakens just as the camera zooms in on her eye and cuts to the credits.

Cast

Production
In May 2019, it was announced Gina Rodriguez had joined the cast of the film, with Mark Raso directing from a screenplay by himself and Joseph Raso and with Netflix distributing. In August 2019, Jennifer Jason Leigh, Barry Pepper, Finn Jones, Shamier Anderson, Ariana Greenblatt, Frances Fisher, Lucius Hoyos and Gil Bellows joined the cast of the film.

Principal photography began in August 2019.

Reception
 

Nick Allen at The Playlist called it "abysmal" gave the film a "D." He wrote that the movie "proves it has no idea how to present its one original idea with visual thrills, and it foolishly underestimates how performance is key to horror like this."

References

External links
 

American science fiction thriller films
American science fiction action films
American action thriller films
Entertainment One films
2021 science fiction action films
2021 action thriller films
2020s science fiction thriller films
Films about sleep disorders
Films scored by Antônio Pinto
2020s English-language films
Films directed by Mark Raso
2020s American films